Walter Elder (born 2 October 1991) is an American rugby union player who plays as a prop. He plays for Kansas City Blues and the United States national rugby sevens team. He debuted for the Eagles against Chile at the 2017 USA Sevens tournament on 3 March 2017.

References

Living people
1991 births
American rugby union players
United States international rugby sevens players
Kansas City Blues Rugby players